Aknazarovo (Aqnazar) is a rural locality (a village) in Saryshevsky Selsoviet, Meleuzovsky District, Bashkortostan, Russia. The population was 168 as of 2010. There are 3 streets.

Geography 
Aknazarovo is located 37 km southeast of Meleuz (the district's administrative centre) by road. Yumaguzino is the nearest rural locality.

References 

Rural localities in Meleuzovsky District